Ed, Eddie, Edgar, Edward, Edwin, and similar, surnamed Smith, may refer to:

Military
Edward H. Smith (sailor) (1889–1961), United States Coast Guard admiral, oceanographer and Arctic explorer
Edward Smith (VC) (1898–1940), English recipient of the Victoria Cross during the First World War
Edwin P. Smith (born 1945), U.S. general, commander of Army, Pacific 1998–2002
Edwin Smith (Medal of Honor) (1841–?), American Civil War sailor and Medal of Honor recipient

Politics and law
E. D. Smith (1853–1948), Canadian businessman and politician
Ed Smith (alderman), alderman for Chicago's 28th ward
Eddie Smith (politician) (born 1979), member of the Tennessee House of Representatives
Edward Clarke Smith (1864–1924), mayor of Manchester, New Hampshire
Edward Curtis Smith (1854–1935), governor of Vermont
Edward Dunlap Smith (1807–1883), Presbyterian clergyman and Chaplain of the United States House of Representatives
Edward Everett Smith (1861–1931), lieutenant governor of Minnesota
Edward G. Smith (born 1961), American judge in Pennsylvania
Edward H. Smith (politician) (1809–1885), U.S. Representative from New York
Edward J. Smith (American politician) (1927–2010), member of the Rhode Island House of Representatives
Edward J. Smith (Canadian politician) (1819–1903), merchant and political figure in New Brunswick, Canada
Edward Smith (New Zealand politician) (1839–1907), New Zealand armourer and Liberal Party politician
Edward McMurray Smith (1870–1953), Iowa Secretary of State and newspaper editor
Edward O. Smith (1817–1892), American pioneer, businessman and politician
Edward Parsons Smith (1860–1930), mayor of Omaha, Nebraska, 1918–1921
Edward Percy Smith (1891–1968), British Conservative Member of Parliament for Ashford, 1943–1950
Edward Samuel Smith (1919–2001), U.S. federal judge
Edward Smith (trade unionist), of Springfield, Sangamon County, Ill
Edward Smith (judge) (1602–1682), Chief Justice of the Irish Common Pleas
Edward Smith (MP) (c. 1704–1762), English Member of Parliament for Leicestershire, 1734–1762
Edward "Smitty" Smith (born 1980), candidate for Attorney General of the District of Columbia
Edwin C. Smith (1852–1924), miner, rancher and political figure in British Columbia
Edwin O. Smith (c. 1871–1960), American politician in the Connecticut House of Representatives
Edwin Thomas Smith (1830–1919), South Australian politician
Ellison D. Smith (1864–1944), nicknamed "Cotton Ed", U.S. senator from South Carolina
Edward Smith (governor), army officer and governor of the Isle of Man
Sir Edward Smith, 1st Baronet (c. 1630–1707), English landowner and politician
Ed Smith (Canadian politician) (born 1928), Canadian politician in British Columbia
Edward Delafield Smith (1826–1878), American lawyer and United States Attorney
Edward L. Smith, Connecticut  judge, mayor and United States Attorney

Sports
Ed Smith (1880s pitcher), Baltimore Monumentals baseball player 
Ed Smith (1900s pitcher) (1879–1956), St. Louis Browns baseball player
Ed Smith (running back) (1913–1998), American football player, model for the Heisman Trophy
Ed Smith (halfback) (1923–2010), fullback in the American National Football League
Ed Smith (quarterback) (born 1956), American football quarterback
Ed Smith (basketball) (1929–1998), New York Knicks basketball player
Ed Smith (cricketer) (born 1977), English cricketer
Ed Smith (defensive end) (born 1950), American football defensive end
Ed Smith (linebacker) (born 1957), American football linebacker
Ed Smith (tight end) (born 1969), basketball and American football player
Ed Smith (streetball player), American streetball player
Eddie Smith (pitcher) (1913–1994), baseball pitcher
Eddie Smith (baseball coach) (born 1984), American baseball coach
Eddie Smith (cyclist) (1926–1997), Australian cyclist
Eddie Smith (footballer) (1929–1993), English footballer
Eddie Smith (referee) (born 1965), Scottish football referee
Eddie Smith (basketball) (born 1983), basketball player
Edgar Smith (outfielder) (1860–?), Major League Baseball player
Edgar Smith (pitcher/outfielder) (1862–1892), American professional baseball player
Edgar Smith (rower) (born 1950), Canadian Olympic rower
Edward Smith (cricketer, born 1831) (1831–1899), English cricketer
Edward Smith (cricketer, born 1854) (1854–1909), English cricketer and clergyman
Edward Smith (cricketer, born 1911) (1911–1999), Australian cricketer
Edwin Alex Smith (tight end) (born 1982), American football player 
Edwin Smith (cricketer, born 1934), Derbyshire cricketer
Edwin Smith (cricketer, born 1848) (1848–1880), English cricketer
Edwin Smith (cricketer, born 1860) (1860–1939), English cricketer
Edwin Smith (rower) (1922–1997), New Zealand rower, silver medalist at the 1950 Empire Games
Edwin Smith (footballer), English footballer for Crystal Palace

Engineers and scientists
Edgar Albert Smith (1847–1916), British zoologist and malacologist
Edgar Fahs Smith (1854–1928), American scientist specializing in the history of chemistry
Edward Smith (physician) (1819–1874), British physician and medical writer
Edwin Smith (metallurgist) (1931–2010), British metallurgy scientist

Writers and the arts
E. E. Smith (1890–1965), better known as E.E. "Doc" Smith, science fiction author
Eden Smith (1858–1949), Canadian architect
Edgar Smith (librettist) (1857–1938), American actor and lyricist
Edward Smith (biographer) (1839–1919), English biographer
Edward Gordon Smith (1857–1906), British postcard publisher
Edward Wyke Smith (1871–1935), English author, mining engineer and adventurer
Edwin Dalton Smith, English artist and engraver
Edwin Smith (Egyptologist) (1822–1906), American antiquities collector
Edwin Smith (photographer) (1912–1971), English photographer
Edwin W. Smith (1876–1957), South African born missionary, anthropologist and writer in Africa
Ed Smith (sculptor) (born 1956), American sculptor and printmaker
Edward Tyrrel Smith, British entrepreneur and showman

Others
Eddie Smith (trade unionist) (died 1945), British trade union leader
Edgar Smith (murderer) (1934–2017), American kidnapper and murderer
Edgar Lawrence Smith (1882–1971), American economist, investment manager and author
Edward Smith (sea captain) (1850–1912), captain of the RMS Titanic when she sank
Edward Smith (thief), committed one of the first bank robberies in the United States
Edward B. Smith, founder of Edward B. Smith & Co., became brokerage firm Smith Barney
Edward Parmelee Smith (1827–1876), Congregational minister in Massachusetts
Edward Shrapnell Smith (1875–1952), British pioneer and promoter of commercial road transport
Edwin Smith (architect) (1870–1965), New South Wales Government Architect 1929–1935
Edwin Mitchell Smith (1847–1929), Surveyor General of South Australia
Eddie Smith, murder victim, see Jeffrey Dahmer

See also
Ted Smith (disambiguation)
Edgar Smith (disambiguation)
Edmund Smith (disambiguation)
Edward Smyth (disambiguation)
Edward Smythe (disambiguation)